Høvringsvatnet or Høvringsvatn is a lake in the municipality of Evje og Hornnes in Agder county, Norway.

See also
List of lakes in Aust-Agder
List of lakes in Norway

References

Lakes of Agder
Evje og Hornnes